The Minneapolis Park and Recreation Board (MPRB) is an independent park district that owns, maintains, and programs activities in public parks in Minneapolis, Minnesota, United States. It has 500 full-time and 1,300 part-time employees and an $111 million operating and capital budget.

The Minneapolis park system has been called the best-designed, best-financed, and best-maintained in America. Minneapolis was rated the #1 park system in the country for the sixth year in a row by The Trust for Public Land in 2018 and again in 2020.

History

The Minneapolis Park and Recreation Board was created by an act of the Minnesota State Legislature and a vote of Minneapolis residents in 1883. Charles M. Loring was elected the first president of the board. Loring convinced landowners to donate property around Bde Maka Ska, Lake Harriet and Lake of the Isles, as well as on Minnehaha Creek.

Loring hired Horace Cleveland to create the original plan for Minneapolis parks in 1883, Cleveland's finest landscape architecture, preserving geographical landmarks and linking them with boulevards and parkways. Loring and Cleveland were instrumental in creating Minnehaha Park, with its falls as a centerpiece.

Wirth was an advocate of active recreation in all city parks and put up signs saying "Please Walk on the Grass." Wirth also promoted neighborhood parks for the whole city, his plans called for a playground within  of every child and a recreation center within  of all residents. In 2017, 97% of all residents live within a 10-minute walk of a park.

In July 2020, the park board voted to allow encampments for people experiencing homelessness at up to 20 city parks with 25 tents each. The change in policy came after several hundred people took up residence in Powderhorn Park in the aftermath of the murder of George Floyd by a Minneapolis police officer. However, the Powderhorn situation became untenable after numerous sexual assaults, fights, and drug use reported at the encampment generated alarm for nearby residents, leading to the eviction of many people in tents. Four people died in encampments in city parks in 2020, including a 38-year-old man who was stabbed to death on January 3, 2021, at an encampment in Minnehaha Park.

On November 18, 2020, the board legalized female topfreedom in the parks.

Description
The park system's  make up 15% of the total area of Minneapolis, one of the highest ratios in the country.

The city's Chain of Lakes, consisting of seven lakes and Minnehaha Creek, is connected by bike, running, and walking paths and used for swimming, fishing, picnics, boating, and ice skating. A parkway for cars, a bikeway for riders, and a walkway for pedestrians runs parallel along the  route of the Grand Rounds National Scenic Byway. Parks are also connected through the Mississippi National River and Recreation Area regional parks and visitor centers.

The country's oldest public wildflower garden, the Eloise Butler Wildflower Garden and Bird Sanctuary, is located within Theodore Wirth Park. Wirth Park extends into Golden Valley and is almost 90% the size of Central Park in New York City. Site of the  Minnehaha Falls, Minnehaha Park is one of the city's oldest and most popular parks, receiving over 850,000 visitors each year. Henry Wadsworth Longfellow named Hiawatha's wife Minnehaha for the Minneapolis waterfall in The Song of Hiawatha, a bestselling and often-parodied 19th century poem.

The first natural swimming pool in the United States opened in Webber Park in 2015. The outdoor pool does not use any chemicals, rather it uses natural filters and plants in several container ponds to keep the water clean.

Facilities

The Minneapolis Park and Recreation Board facilities include  of land and water, 179 properties,  of biking and walking paths, 49 recreation centers, 22 lakes, 12 formal gardens, and seven golf courses.

Bohanon Park
Bohemian Flats
Cedar Lake
Gold Medal Park
Grand Rounds National Scenic Byway
Kenilworth Trail
Bde Maka Ska
Lake Harriet
Lake Hiawatha
Lake of the Isles
Lake Nokomis
Lyndale Park
Midtown Greenway
Mill Ruins Park
Minneapolis Sculpture Garden
Minnehaha Park
Mississippi Gorge Regional Park
North Mississippi Regional Park
Parade Stadium
Theodore Wirth Park
Tower Hill Park
Victory Memorial Parkway
Winchell Trail

Governance
The Minneapolis Park and Recreation Board is an independently elected, semi-autonomous park district responsible for governing, maintaining, and developing the Minneapolis park system. The jurisdiction of the park board is contiguous with the City of Minneapolis borders, although it owns and operates four golf courses outside the city limits.

Minneapolis voters elect nine commissioners every four years: one from each of the six park districts, and three that serve at-large. The district and at-large members are elected using ranked choice voting. The Board of Commissioners appoints the superintendent and sets policy for the park board.

Police
The Superintendent of the Parks has oversight of the Minneapolis Park Police Department—the law enforcement authority of the park board. Led by a park police chief, the force consists of 30 sworn officers and 20 part-time park patrol agents. The park police is a separate entity than the Minneapolis Police Department, but the two forces had shared training, support services, and authority to police in both parks and throughout the city. The park board voted unanimously on June 3, 2020, to end its relationship with the Minneapolis Police Department following the murder of George Floyd by a city police officer. The decision prohibited Minneapolis police officers from staffing park events and prohibited park police form assisting the Minneapolis Police Department. Nearly two years later, on May 4, 2022, the park board restored its relationship with the Minneapolis Police Department to allow the return of large events in parks that had been disrupted due to the COVID-19 pandemic.

See also
2020 Minneapolis park encampments
Trails in Minneapolis
Theodore Wirth House–Administration Building

References

Further reading

External links

Government of Minneapolis
Park districts in the United States
1883 establishments in Minnesota
Mississippi Gorge